Narco was a settlement and station (mutatio) of ancient Thrace, inhabited during Byzantine times. 

Its site is located east of Bergule in European Turkey.

References

Populated places in ancient Thrace
Former populated places in Turkey
Populated places of the Byzantine Empire
History of Kırklareli Province